The sneng or snaeng ("horn") is an aerophone made from an ox horn or water buffalo horn. It is loud enough to call across a distance and has been used in rural environments to signal mealtimes, give warning, call for help or indicate a need to return to the village. It was also used to call domestic elephants in from the field, and hunters communicated with it.

Two different types of sneng exist:

The more common one is a side-blown instrument with a rectangular hole on the side of the horn, where a bamboo single-free-reed mouthpiece is fastened with wax. The reed there can be either blown or sucked to produce a tone. Both ends of the horn are open and function as finger holes to change the pitch, the pointed end covered by the left index finger and the wide end covered by the right palm. This type is capable of two notes, tuned a fourth apart.
Another type is an end-blown instrument with the tip of the horn cut off and without the bamboo mouthpiece, like the conventional blowing horn. It is less common because it produces only one note.

See also
Abeng a similar side-blown horn in Jamaica
Tơ đjếp The Vietnamese version of the instrument

References

External links
Sneng playing, with the side-blown free-reed sneng in the center and the end-blown snengs in the background
Cambodian concert, begins with Sneng solo. Two two finderholes are 1) under the player's left forefinger, and 2 the large hole under his right hand.
Sneng solo
Koy horn (Thailand) at the Metropolitan Museum of Art
Kwai horn (Myanmar) at the Metropolitan Museum of Art

Cambodian musical instruments
Natural horns and trumpets
Free reed aerophones